Bardneshandeh (also Romanized as Bardneshāndeh; also known as Bardeh Neshāndeh) is a village in Margha Rural District, in the Central District of Izeh County, Khuzestan Province, Iran. At the 2006 census, its population was 193, in 37 families.

References 

Populated places in Izeh County